Donnie K. Von Hemel (born September 10, 1961, in Manter, Kansas) is a trainer of  Thoroughbred racehorses. The son of trainer Don Von Hemel and brother to trainer Kelly Von Hemel, he obtained a degree in accounting from Fort Hays State University but in 1984 chose a training career. 

An Oklahoma Horse Racing Hall of Fame inductee, in 2011 Von Hemel won the richest race of his career when Caleb's Posse captured the $1 million Breeders' Cup Dirt Mile hosted that year by Churchill Downs.

References

Living people
1961 births
Fort Hays State University alumni
American horse trainers
People from Stanton County, Kansas